Victoria Square is an unincorporated community in Markham, Ontario, Canada.  The community was formed in the early nineteenth century.

History

Historic Victoria Square began at 4th Line (Victoria Square Boulevard) and 18th Line (Elgin Mills Road) in 1805 with mostly Mennonites from Pennsylvania beginning in 1803 and then by British and American settlers in the 1820s. The area was initially called Heise Hill for the Heise family whom were part of the first wave of settlers.

The first church (Primitive Methodist) was built in 1830s on the east side of 4th Line, where the cemetery is still located. The Wesleyan Methodists built a wood-frame church south of the Victoria Square corner in 1845. This was replaced by a red brick edifice in 1880 at what was once William Frisby's old blacksmith shop.

The Wesleyan Methodists and Primitive Methodist merged locations in 1884 at what is now Victoria Square United Church.

A number of business emerged in the 1830 at the intersection of 4th Line and 18th Line:

 William Frisby blacksmith and farm implement shops southeast corner 
 William Cantly's inn emerged in the 1830s on the northeast corner and later became a tavern when William Durose was granted a licence in 1849 
 Post office was opened in the northwest corner in 1854
 
By 1860 and 1870s a few more businesses appeared:

 carriage maker - Joseph Hall
 John Rowbotham, former wheelwright with Frisby opened a shop manufacturing wagons and bobsled maker and repair to implements for Frisby

The 1877 SS No. 69 was opened further south and was used until 1966. The building was altered and became a business then as residence until it was restored back for use as a Montessori school in 2010.

The farmer implement related business would eventually disappear with competition of larger rivals in Toronto.  The tavern destroyed by fire in the early 1900s was not replaced and the post office closed in 1914.
The four corners were replaced by residences wiping out all traces of commercial activity in the area.

Modern Community

Today's residential development of the area began in the 2006 with the development of Cathedraltown to the south and west of Victoria Square and accelerated with the building of the new bypass of Woodbine Avenue in 2010.

Today, farmlands are slowly but progressively disappearing in the area and replaced with newer executive homes in the surrounding Unionville district. Most homes in the area are single-family dwellings. Farms now only exists in to the east of Victoria Square Boulevard (the original route of Woodbine Avenue) and north of Major Mackenzie Drive.

A number of business that operate off the land exists in Victoria Square:

 19th Avenue Farmers' Market is a new generation of farming family whom operate a market and pick your own fields at 19th Avenue and Woodbine Avenue.
 Baker Saddlery - business selling equestrian equipment

New business to the area include Honda Canada Inc. Canadian corporate office and Mobis Parts Canada (a subsidiary of Hyundai).

The community of Victoria Square is centred on the intersection of Victoria Square Blvd. and Major Mackenzie Dr.

There are a few reminders in the new area of the originally settlers whom farmed the area:

 Frisby Park - named for Frisby family
 Boynton Circle - named for Boynton family

Parks and recreation
 Victoria Square Park
 Victoria Square Community Centre
 Cathedral (King David) Park
 Frisby Park
 Vine Cliff Park
 Hazelton Park
 Fletcher's Field
 Mossy Stone Park
 Charity Crescent Park

Education

There are three public elementary schools:

 Sir Wilfrid Laurier Public School (French Immersion, Grades 3–8)
 Sir John A Macdonald Public School
 Victoria Square Public School (Opened September 2018) (Dual Track French Immersion (Grades 1&2 FI, JK-8 English)

Transportation
Due to its northerly location, most commuters in the area use the regional roads and Ontario Highway 404. The area is serviced by York Region Transit. The former Woodbine Avenue Bypass or Victoria Square Boulevard, Elgin Mills Road, Major Mackenzie Drive and Warden Avenue are the main arterial roads serving the area.

Nearby communities

Other than Gormley, Victoria Square is surrounded by planned residential communities created from former farmlands.

See also

 List of unincorporated communities in Ontario

References

Neighbourhoods in Markham, Ontario